This is a list of people treated with electroconvulsive therapy (ECT).

 Linda Andre, American author, activist, director of the Committee for Truth in Psychiatry (CTIP), and self-described psychiatric survivor.
 Antonin Artaud, French poet and playwright
 Frances Farmer, American film actress, who described standing in line with other girls at mental hospital waiting for shock treatments in the 1940s. 
 Tammy Wynette, American country singer and composer, who described having a series of shock treatments for depression in her biography. 
 Dick Cavett, American television talk show host
 Ted Chabasinski, American attorney, activist, and self-described psychiatric survivor who received ECT at six years of age.
 Clementine Churchill, wife of Sir Winston Churchill 
 Paulo Coelho, author of The Alchemist
 Simone D., a pseudonym for a psychiatric patient in the Creedmoor Psychiatric Center in New York, who in 2007 won a court ruling which set aside a two-year-old court order to give her electroshock treatment against her will
 Duplessis Orphans Orphans of the 1950s in the province of Quebec, Canada, endured electroshock.
 Kitty Dukakis, wife of former Massachusetts governor and 1988 Democratic presidential nominee Michael Dukakis and author of Shock, a book chronicling her experiences with ECT
 Thomas Eagleton, US senator and vice presidential candidate
 Eduard Einstein (28 July 1910 – 25 October 1965) Albert Einstein's second son had ECT. Hans Albert Einstein, his brother thought the psychiatric treatment made him worse.
 Roky Erickson, American singer, songwriter, harmonica player and guitarist
 Carrie Fisher, American actress and novelist Fisher speaks at length of her experiences with ECT in her autobiography Wishful Drinking.
 Janet Frame, New Zealand writer and poet
 Leonard Roy Frank, is a published author, human rights activist, and self-described psychiatric survivor.
 Judy Garland, Singer, dancer, actress.
 Harold Gimblett, British cricketer
 Julie Goodyear, English actress from Coronation Street.
 Peter Green, English blues guitarist, founding member of Fleetwood Mac.
 David Helfgott, Australian pianist
 Ernest Hemingway, American Pulitzer Prize–winning novelist, Nobel Laureate, short-story writer, and journalist
 Gregory Hemingway, son of Ernest Hemingway
 Marya Hornbacher, American writer
 Vladimir Horowitz, Russian-American classical pianist
 Vivien Leigh, English actress and second wife of Laurence Olivier
 Oscar Levant, American pianist, composer, television and film personality
 Karolina Olsson, the "Sleeping Beauty of Oknö"
 Carmen Miranda, Luso-Brazilian Singer, dancer, actress.
 Michael Moriarty, American actor
 Robbie Muir, Australian rules football player - when aged seven.
 Sherwin B. Nuland, American surgeon and writer
 Sam Phillips, founder, Sun Records, discoverer of Elvis Presley 
 Robert M. Pirsig, who later wrote about his experience in the autobiographical novel Zen and the Art of Motorcycle Maintenance.
 Sylvia Plath, American writer and poet
 Emil Post, American mathematician, died in 1954 of a heart attack following electroshock treatment for depression; he was 57.
 Bud Powell, American jazz musician
 Lou Reed, American singer-songwriter 
 Marilyn Rice, anti-electroconvulsive therapy activist 
 Paul Robeson, American bass singer and actor 
 Yves Saint-Laurent, French fashion designer
 Peggy S. Salters, from South Carolina, in 2005 became the first survivor of electroshock treatment in the United States to win a jury verdict and a large money judgment ($635,177) in compensation for extensive permanent amnesia and cognitive disability caused by the procedure
 Edie Sedgwick, American socialite and Warhol superstar
William Styron, American author
 Gene Tierney, American actress
 Townes van Zandt, American country singer-songwriter
 David Foster Wallace, American writer 
Mike Wallace,  American journalist
Andrew Loog Oldham, manager of The Rolling Stones
Louis Althusser, French marxist philosopher

References

Electroconvulsive therapy
Physical psychiatric treatments
Electroconvulsive therapy